Sooliyakkottai is a village in the Ammapettai revenue block, Papanasam taluk, Thanjavur district of Tamil Nadu state, India.

Demographics
Sooliyakkottai has the population of 2316. The male population is 1125 and female population is 1196. The literacy rate of the village is 72.53%.This is lower than that of the state Tamil Nadu which has a literacy rate of 80.09% according to 2011 Census.

References

Villages in Thanjavur district